Minuscule 134 (in the Gregory-Aland numbering), ε 200 (Soden), is a Greek minuscule manuscript of the New Testament, on parchment leaves. Palaeographically it has been assigned to the 12th century. It has marginalia.

Description 

The codex contains the text of the four Gospels on 297 parchment leaves (size ). The text is written in one column per page, 20 lines per page (size of text 13.9 by 9.7) in brown ink.
According to Scrivener it is written by an elegant hand.

The titles in gold. There is also another division according to the smaller Ammonian Sections (Mark 233 sections – 16:8), with references to the Eusebian Canons (written below Ammonian Section numbers).

The  Pericope Adulterae (John 7:53-8:11) is omitted.

Text 

The Greek text of the codex is a representative of the Byzantine text-type. Hermann von Soden classified it to the textual family Family Kx. Aland placed it in Category V.
According to the Claremont Profile Method it belongs to the textual cluster 22b in Luke 1, Luke 10, and Luke 20, as a weak member.

History 

The manuscript was examined by Birch about 1782. C. R. Gregory saw it in 1886.

It is currently housed at the Vatican Library (Vat. gr. 364), at Rome.

See also 

 List of New Testament minuscules
 Biblical manuscript
 Textual criticism
 * * *

References

Further reading 

 

Greek New Testament minuscules
12th-century biblical manuscripts
Manuscripts of the Vatican Library